Joseph Holland (born 21 April 1993) is an English footballer who plays as a midfielder.

Career

College and youth
Holland moved to the United States in 2012 to play college soccer at Hofstra University, where he played until 2016, including a redshirt year in 2013. While playing for Hofstra, Holland was named 2012 CAA Rookie of the Year, second team All-CAA in 2012, first team All-CAA in 2014, 2015, and 2016,  NSCAA second team All-American in 2015, and CAA Player of the Year in 2015.

While at college, Holland played with USL PDL clubs Long Island Rough Riders and Ventura County Fusion.

Professional

Houston Dynamo 
On 13 January 2017, Holland was selected 10th overall in the 2017 MLS SuperDraft by the Houston Dynamo. He signed with Houston on 1 March 2017.  He made his Dynamo debut on 17 May, coming off the bench in a 2–0 loss to the Philadelphia Union.  He made 5 MLS appearances and played twice in the Open Cup for the Dynamo during the 2017 season.  Although Houston qualified for the 2017 MLS playoffs, Holland did not appear in any of Houston's 5 games.

He spent most of the 2017 season on loan at Rio Grande Valley FC Toros, Houston's USL affiliate.  Holland made his professional and Toros debut on 22 April  during a 1–0 loss to the Tulsa Roughnecks.  He scored his first goal for RGVFC on April 29 in a 3–0 win over OKC Energy.  He ended the year having scored 4 goals and picking up 1 assist in 13 appearances for the Toros.

On 5 December 2017, Houston declined Holland's contract option for 2018.

Pittsburgh Riverhounds 
On 27 February 2018, Holland signed with USL side Pittsburgh Riverhounds.  He made his Riverhounds debut on 24 March in a 0–0 draw with Nashville SC.  He ended the regular season with 1 assist and 14 appearances, helping Pittsburgh finish 3rd in the Eastern Conference.  In the Riverhounds opening playoff game, Holland came on as a late substitute.  In the 119th minute, he got a red card with the game tied at 2–2.  Pittsburgh would lose to Bethlehem Steel 8–7 in a penalty shoot-out.

Birmingham Legion 
On 20 November 2018, Holland signed with USL Championship side Birmingham Legion.  He made his debut for Birmingham on 16 March, coming on as a substitute in a 1–0  loss to Ottawa Fury.  Holland made 15 appearances for the Legion in the USLC regular season and 2 in the Open Cup, but he did not appear in either of their playoff games.

Career statistics

References

External links
 

1993 births
Living people
Association football midfielders
English expatriate footballers
English footballers
Expatriate soccer players in the United States
Hofstra Pride men's soccer players
Long Island Rough Riders players
Ventura County Fusion players
Houston Dynamo FC players
Rio Grande Valley FC Toros players
Pittsburgh Riverhounds SC players
Birmingham Legion FC players
Houston Dynamo FC draft picks
USL League Two players
Major League Soccer players
USL Championship players
English expatriate sportspeople in the United States
Footballers from Birmingham, West Midlands